The National Academy of Engineering most commonly refers to the academy in the United States.

National Academy of Engineering may also refer to:
 Australian Academy of Technology and Engineering
 Canadian Academy of Engineering
 Chinese Academy of Engineering
 Hong Kong Academy of Engineering Sciences
 Indian National Academy of Engineering
 National Academy of Engineering of Korea
 Royal Academy of Engineering of Spain
 Royal Swedish Academy of Engineering Sciences
 Royal Academy of Engineering (United Kingdom)
 Russian Academy of Engineering
 South African Academy of Engineering

See also
 French Academy of Technologies
 Norwegian Academy of Technological Sciences